Thulasi or Tulasi may refer to:

 Tulasi or Ocimum tenuiflorum,  an aromatic plant in the family Lamiaceae
 Tulasi (film), a 2007 Tollywood film by Boyapati Srinu
 Thulasi (1987 film), a 1987 Tamil film starring Murali and Seetha
 Thulasi (1976 film), a 1976 Indian Kannada film
 Tulsidas or Tulasidas (1532–1623), Indian saint and poet
 Thulasidas, Indian film director
 Tulasi (actress) (born 1967), Indian film actress